The 2020 English football summer transfer window ran from 27 July to 5 October 2020 due to the effects of the COVID-19 pandemic on the football calendar. Players without a club could be signed at any time, clubs could sign players on loan dependent on their league's regulations, and clubs could sign a goalkeeper on an emergency loan if they had no registered senior goalkeeper available. This list includes transfers featuring at least one club from either the Premier League or the EFL that were completed after the end of the winter 2019–20 transfer window on 31 January and before the end of the 2020 summer window.

Transfers
All players and clubs without a flag are English. Note that while Cardiff City, Swansea City and Newport County are affiliated with the Football Association of Wales and thus take the Welsh flag, they play in the Championship and League Two respectively, and so their transfers are included here.

Loans

References

2020–21 in English football
England
Summer 2020